The following cities have, or historically had, defensive walls.

Africa

Algeria
 Algiers
 Ghardaïa
 Timimoun

Egypt
 Al-Fustat
 Cairo
 Damietta

See List of Egypt castles, forts, fortifications and city walls.

Ethiopia
 Harar

Libya
Apollonia
Benghazi
Cyrene
Derna
Germa
Ghadames
Ghat
Jaghbub
Kabaw
Murzuq
Nalut
Sokna
Tolmeita
Tripoli
Waddan

Mali
 Djenné 
 Gao
 Timbuktu

Morocco
 Agadir
 Aït Benhaddou
 Asilah
 Azemmour
 Casablanca
 Chefchaouen
 Eljadida
 Essaouira
 Fes
 Ksar el-Kebir
 Ksar es-Seghir
 Larache
 Marrakech
 Meknes
 Moulay Abdallah
 Moulay Idriss
 Ouarzazate
 Oujda
 Rabat
 Safi
 Salé
 Sefrou
 Tangier
 Taroudannt – best preserved in Morocco
 Taza
 Tétouan
 Tiznit

Niger
 Zinder, Niger was well known for its city wall, the remains of which can still be seen

Nigeria
 Benin City
Kano
Keffi

Tunisia
 Bizerte
 Hammamet
 Kairouan
 Monastir
 Sfax 
 Sousse
 Tozeur
 Tunis

Americas

Canada

Chile
Valdivia

Colombia

 Cartagena

Cuba
 La Habana

Dominican Republic
Santo Domingo was a fortified city from the 16th to the early 20th centuries. Parts of the wall are still visible in the Colonial Zone. One of the main gates is very well preserved and centuries ago was named "The Gate of the Count" after the Count of Peñalba, who stopped the invasion of William Penn and Robert Venables during the Siege of Santo Domingo.

Mexico

 Campeche - majority of the walls around the old town survive
 Mayapan (Maya ruins)
 Mérida, Yucatán (mostly demolished in the late 19th century, but some segments and arched gateways remain)
 Mexico City 
 Tulum (Maya ruins)
 Veracruz (walls demolished in the 19th century, but a bastion remains)

Panama
Old Quarter of Panama City (a portion of the Wall still exists)

Peru
 Lima
 Trujillo

Puerto Rico
 San Juan

United States
Boston, Massachusetts, maintained a defensive city wall and gate across Boston Neck, the sole point where the city was connected with the mainland, from 1631 until the end of the 18th century.
Charleston, South Carolina was a walled city from the 1690s until the 1720s. A portion of the wall, called Half Moon Battery, is still visible in the Provost Dungeon of the Old Exchange Building.
St. Augustine, Florida, starting in 1704, the Spanish constructed the Cubo Line – attached to the Castillo de San Marcos and enclosing the city.  18th century maps detail the walls enclosing all of St. Augustine
New Orleans, Louisiana, planned in 1718 as a walled city. The wall was present during the Battle of New Orleans, but was found to be in such a state of disarray that it could not be used.

Uruguay 

Montevideo
 Colonia del Sacramento

Asia

Afghanistan
 Balkh, the ancient city

China

 Beijing, see City Wall of Beijing. Many parts of the walls of Beijing were demolished during the 1960s to open large streets around the city. A metro line also follows the location of the former city walls.
 Xiangyang
 Guangzhou
 Dali
 Shangqiu
 Jianshui
 Zhangjiakou, see Wanquan District
 Zhaoqing
 Guangfu Ancient City
 Xingcheng
 Liaocheng
 Kaifeng
 Qiansuo in Huludao
 Datong
 Daming County
 Yongtai Fortress
 Jingzhou
 Kowloon Walled City, a former enclave of Hong Kong
 Nanjing, see City Wall of Nanjing
 Linhai
 Qufu
 Taiyuan, see Jinyuan District
 Pingyao
 Shanghai (Old City (Shanghai)) – largely destroyed in 1912, only fragments survive
 Songpan
Xi'an – The city of Xi'an has well-preserved walls with a water filled moat that is a tourist attraction incorporating small parks surrounding a busy and modern area of the city.
 Zhengding
Yuanzhou District in Guyuan
 Walled villages can still be found in Mainland China and Hong Kong.

India

 Agra
 Ahmedabad
 Amravati
 Amritsar
 Datia
 Delhi
 Dholavira
 Hyderabad
 Jaipur
 Jaisalmer
 Jodhpur
 Lucknow
 Mumbai (old city of Bombay)
 Raigad
 Udaipur
 Warangal
 Chennai
 Mhow

Indonesia

 Bogor

Pakuan Pajajaran, the capital of the Sunda Kingdom, was surrounded by defensive moats and walls. Now the area is part of the modern city of Bogor.
Jogjakarta
An 18th century wall made by Hamengkubuwono the 1st from the Ngayogyakarta Hadiningrat Kingdom to protect the inner capital city from the Dutch and other enemies during the Mataram Kingdom period. Today, 96% of the wall still exists and is a local landmark.
Surakarta
On 17 February 1745, the Surakarta Kingdom moved to a new opened forest named Sala Village and build their Royal Residential Palace and urban area with a 15 kilometers long of "Beteng Kraton" or Palace wall around it. As of 2022, 90% of the city walls still remain.
Surosowan
Well known as Banten Kingdom's capital. The wall was destroyed by the Dutch during its colonial period in the way to ended the Banten reign. The city wall that left is only about 10% from the real appearance.
Trowulan
Trowulan was the capital of the former Majapahit Empire. When its glory period, the capital being a first European systemized ancient city (with city canal system for transportation and also large aisle and road for major transportation) in Indonesia, because Trowulan was developed in Majapahit's glory period in 13th–15th century.
The wall was protecting the inner "Kraton" or royal palace and some important places. Today the wall can't be seen as the original appearance.

Iran
 Bam
 Isfahan
 Shiraz
 Tabriz
 Yazd

Iraq
 Babylon
 Baghdad
 Basra
 Arbil (central city, fully intact)

Israel/Palestine
 Acre – 18th-century modern Ottoman fortification able to withstand cannon attack. The wall has been restored and now includes a rampart for tourists.
Jaffa 
Safed
Tiberias
Jerusalem - The Book of Nehemiah is a narrative of Jews rebuilding the city's walls during the return to Zion.

Lebanon
 Baalbek: sections of the Arab fortifications (built with stones from Roman structures) can still be seen around the Acropolis and the old town
 Batroun: the town is known for its 225 m long Phoenician seawall. There was also a 9th-century BC citadel, parts of which are still visible
 Beirut: sections of the Phoenician and Roman fortifications and Ottoman citadel have been unearthed in the city's central district. The famous walls erected by Emir Fakhruddin II have yet to be recovered.
 Byblos: the old town is surrounded by medieval walls, with a castle standing at their Southern edge
 Sidon: little remains today of the city's medieval fortifications, except the Castle of St. Louis.

Malaysia
 Malacca – Built by the Portuguese after the city's occupation in 1511, it was torn down by the British in 1806. Known locally as the A Famosa.

Pakistan
Almost every old city in Pakistan had a defensive wall. Much of these walls were destroyed by the British in order to refortify the cities. Few cities which were fortified are:

 Hyderabad
 Lahore
 Multan
 Peshawar
 Shikarpur
 hazro, district Attock

Palestine
Old City of Jerusalem
Nablus
Ancient Jericho

Philippines

 Cebu (see Fort San Pedro)
 Manila (Intramuros) – partially preserved, partially restored after World War II. Original walls are still well preserved.
 Olongapo ("Spanish Gate")
 Ozamiz (Fuerte de la Concepción y del Triunfo)
 Zamboanga (see Fort Pilar)

South Korea

 Dongnae (now part of Busan) (See Dongnaeeupseong.)
 Seoul (See Fortress Wall of Seoul.)
 Suwon (See Hwaseong Fortress.)
 Gwangju, Gyeonggi (See Namhansanseong.)
 Goyang (See Bukhansanseong)

Sri Lanka
 Galle (See Galle Fort.)
 Matara (See Matara Fort.)

Syria
 Aleppo
 Damascus
 Homs

Taiwan
 Changhua
 Chiayi
 Fongshan (now part of Kaohsiung)
 Hengchun (see Hengchun Old Town)
 Hsinchu
 Magong
 Puli
 Quemoy
 Tainan
 Taipei (see Walls of Taipei)
 Zuoying (now part of Kaohsiung, see Old City of Zuoying)
Some other towns fortified with thorny bamboos in Qing era.

Thailand

 Ayutthaya
 Bangkok – See Fortifications of Bangkok
 Chiang Mai was surrounded by a moat and city walls when it was established by King Mangrai the Great in 1296. They were extensively rebuilt in the early 19th century. Large parts of the city walls and city gates of Chiang Mai survived till the present.
 Chiang Rai
 Chiang Saen
 Kamphaeng Phet
 Lampang
 Lamphun
 Lopburi
 Nakhon Ratchasima
 Nakhon Si Thammarat
 Nan, Thailand
 Phichai
 Phayao
 Phimai
 Phitsanulok
 Phrae
 Si Satchanalai
 Songkhla
 Sukhothai
 Suphanburi
 Thonburi
 Wiang Kum Kam

Uzbekistan

 Bukhara
 Khiva
 Samarkand
 Shahrisabz

Vietnam
 Cổ Loa
 Hà Nội
 Huế
 Bắc Ninh
 Vinh
 Thanh Hóa
 Quảng Trị
 Nam Định
 Mạc citadel
 Sơn Tây citadel

Yemen

 Sana'a
 Shibam

Europe

Albania
 Berat
 Butrint
 Durrës
 Elbasan – sizable remains of Roman walls
 Krujë
 Tepelenë

Austria

Allentsteig
Amstetten Not walled but ditched and banked with gate towers.
Bleiburg
Bludenz
Braunau am Inn
Bregenz
Bruck an der Leitha – partially preserved
Bruck an der Mur
Donnerskirchen.
Drosendorf
Dürnstein
Ebenfurth
Eferding
Eggenburg
Eisenstadt
Enns
Fehring
Feldkirch
Friedberg
Freistadt – almost completely preserved
Friesach
Frohnleiten
Fürstenfeld
Gmünd
Gmuend-in-Kaernten
Gmunden
Graz
Gross-Enzersdorf
Güssing
Hainburg an der Donau – almost completely preserved (2.5 km, 3 gates, 15 towers)
Hallein
Hall in Tirol – partially preserved
Hardegg
Hartberg
Haslach an der Muhl
Heidenreichstein
Herzogenburg
Horn
Judenburg
Kitzbuhel
Klagenfurt
Klosterneuburg
Knittelfeld
Korneuburg
Krems
Kufstein
Laa an der Thaya
Leoben
Leonfelden
Leoben
Lienz
Linz
Litschau
Maissau
Marchegg – some segments preserved
Mautern – remains of the Roman fortress "Favianae" can be found at the western side of the old town. 
Melk
Murau
Mürzzuschlag
Neumarkt am Wallersee
Neumarkt
Obdach
Oberwölz
Oggau am Neusiedler See
Ottensheim
Peuerbach
Pöchlarn
Purbach am Neusiedler See
Raabs an der Thaya
Radfeld
Radkersburg
Radstadt – almost completely preserved wall (13th- to 16th-century); 3 round towers (1530s); 1 gate
Rattenberg
Retz
Ried im Innkreis
Rottenmann
Rust
St Andrä
Sankt Veit an der Glan
St Pölten
Salzburg
Schärding
Scheibbs
Schladming
Schrattenthal
Schwanenstadt the settlement surrounded by a bank, surmounted by wooden palisade, with only a short length of wall adjacent to the ‘‘Stadtturm’’.
Stadtschlaining
Stainach
Stein
Straßburg
Steyr
Steyregg
Traismauer
Tulln an der Donau
Vienna – destroyed and became the Ringstraße
Villach
Vils
Vöcklabruck
Völkermarkt
Voitsberg
Waidhofen an der Thaya
Waidhofen an der Ybbs
Weitra
Wels
Wiener Neustadt
Wilhelmsburg
Wolfsberg
Ybbs an der Donau
Zeiselmauer. The Roman auxiliary fort was re-fortified by the Babenbergs in the 10th century, but never granted a market or charter.
Zistersdorf
Zwettl

Azerbaijan
 Baku, retains most of the city walls that separate the historic Inner City from the newer parts of the city developed after the 19th century.

Belgium

Bosnia and Herzegovina

Bulgaria
 Hisarya – the old Roman town is still almost entirely surrounded by the well preserved ruins of its defensive walls.

 Nessebar - fortified island city

 Nicopolis ad Istrum roman town, Nikyup, Veliko Tarnovo

 Nicopolis ad Nestum roman town, Garmen, Gotse Delchev, Blagoevgrad Province

 Novae roman town, Svishtov
 Pliska as first capital of Danubian Bulgaria
 Plovdiv fortifications and walls – Eastern gate of Philippopolis, Hisar Kapia and Nebet Tepe
 Preslav as capital of Bulgaria
 Silistra
 Sozopol
 Sofia – established as walled city Ulpia Serdica by the Roman emperor Trajan
 Varna
 Veliko Turnovo – three fortified hills – Trapezitsa fortress, Tsarevets fortress and Sveta Gora make one city capital of Bulgaria

 Vidin

Croatia

Cyprus

Czech Republic

 Bechyně
 Bělá pod Bezdězem
 Benátky nad Jizerou
 Beroun
 Bochov
 Bor u Tachova
 Brno
 Broumov
 Bruntál
 Čáslav
 Česká Lípa
 České Budějovice
 Český Brod
 Český Dub
 Český Krumlov
 Cheb
 Chrudim
 Chyše
 Dačice
 Domažlice
 Dvůr Králové nad Labem
 Frýdlant
 Fulnek
 Havlíčkův Brod
 Hlučín
 Horažďovice
 Horšovský Týn
 Hostinné
 Hradec Králové
Hranice
Jablonné v Podještědí
Jaroměř
Jindrichuv Hradec
Jevíčko
Jičín
Jihlava – Large parts of the town walls remain to the south, west and east side of the medieval town. Some fragments remain on the north side. The fortifications are also a good example of a Zwinger.
Jindřichův Hradec
Josefov- originally known as Ples
Kadaň
Klatovy
Kolín
Kostelec nad Labem
Kouřim
Krnov
Kutná Hora
Kromeriz
Lanškroun
Lipník nad Bečvou
Litomyšl
Litovel
Loket (Sokolov District)
Louny
Mělník
Mladá Boleslav
Náchod
Nové Město nad Metují
Nový Bydžov
 Nový Jičín
 Nymburk
 Odry
 Olomouc
 Opočno
 Opava
 Osoblaha
 Ostrava
 Ostrov
 Pardubice
 Písek
 Planá u Mariánských Lázní
 Plzeň
 Plumlov
 Polička – Close to 80% of Policka's town walls survive today, in an excellently preserved condition. 
 Prachatice
 Prague Hradčany
 Prague Malá Strana
 Prague Staré Město
 Prague Nové Město
 Prague Vyšehrad
 Přelouč
 Prostějov
 Přerov
 Rabštejn nad Střelou
 Rakovnik
 Rataje nad Sázavou
 Rokycany
 Rožmitál pod Třemšínem
 Slaný
 Soběslav
 Sobotka
 Stará Boleslav
 Šternberk
 Štramberk
 Strážnice
 Stříbro
 Svitavy
 Šumperk
 Sušice
 Tábor
 Tachov
 Teplá
 Tovačov
 Třeboň
 Trutnov
 Toužim
 Uničov
 Ústí nad Orlicí
 Valtice
 Velvary
 Vidnava
 Vraný
 Vysoké Mýto
 Zábřeh
 Zákupy
 Žatec
 Žlutice
 Znojmo – In Znojmo, more than half of the walls are preserved, with large parts of the zwinger surviving.

Denmark
 Fredericia, extensive renaissance ramparts to the north and west of the city and sea facing ramparts.
 Copenhagen, extensive renaissance ramparts to the south and east, trace remains to the north and west, nice fort at the harbor mouth, three small island fortlets outside the harbor entrance.
 Nyborg – the remains include three preserved bastions, a town gate and the old town is still mostly surrounded by a moat indicating the locations of the other (now demolished) bastions.
 Stege, One of the town gates, the Mølleporten, still remains. Most of the earthwork rampart and dry ditch surrounding the town center still remain.

Estonia

Pärnu, a rampart with two bastions, a moat and a town gate remain to the west of the old town. It is now transformed into a park, the Valli Park.
Tallinn (and Toompea), see Tallinn City Walls, most of the wall and towers remains
Tartu, very few sections remained

Finland

 Hamina Surrounded by about 4–5 km long star-shaped walled fortification
 Lappeenranta The old center of the town is located inside a fortress
 Loviisa It was planned to build a full fortress around the town, but only two bastions were complete
 Suomenlinna An inhabited sea fortress off the coast of Helsinki

France

 Acquigny
 Agde
 Aigues-Mortes
 Ainay-le-Château
 Aire-sur-la-Lys
 Aix-en-Provence
 Alençon, Orne	
 Amance, Haute-Saône	
 Amboise, Indre-et-Loire	
 Ammerschwihr
 Angers, Maine-et-Loire	
 Angoulême
 Antibes
 Apt
 Ardres
 Arles
 Arras
 Aubigny-sur-Nère
 Auch
 Autun
 Auvet-et-la-Chapelotte
 Avallon
 Avesnes-sur-Helpe
 Avignon
 Avranches
 Ayherre
 Bâgé-le-Châtel
 Bargème
 Baux-de-Provence
 Bavay
 Bayonne
 Bazas
 Beaugency
 Beaune
 Beauvais
 Béguios
 Bellême
 Bergheim, Haut-Rhin	
 Bergues
 Besançon
 Blois, Loir-et-Cher	
 Bœrsch
 Boisseron
 Bonneval, Eure-et-Loir	
 Bougue
 Bourbon-Lancy
 Bourges
 Bourg-le-Roi
 Briançon
 Brignon
 Briod
 Bruch, Lot-et-Garonne	
 Cadillac, Gironde	
 Caen
 Cahors
 Campel
 Capdenac
 Carcassonne
 Carignan, Ardennes	
 Caudebec-en-Caux
 Cernay, Haut-Rhin	
 Chalon-sur-Saône
 Champdieu
 Champigneulles
 Champlitte
 Charleville-Mézières
 Château-Thierry, Aisne	
 Châtelais
 Châtillon-sur-Saône
 Chéraute
 Clermont-Ferrand
 Cluny
 Collonges-la-Rouge
 Colmar
 Colmars
 Compiègne
 Compreignac
 Concarneau
 Condé-sur-l'Escaut
 Corbigny
 Cordes-sur-Ciel
 Cormery
 Cosne-Cours-sur-Loire
 Coucy-le-Château-Auffrique – Large parts of the walls remain, though partly in a ruinous state. Remains include several towers, stretches of curtain wall and three gates, the Porte de Laon, Porte de Soissons and the Porte de Chauny. 
 Courthézon
 Crécy-la-Chapelle – fragmentary remains
 Créquy
 Cucuron
 Cuiseaux
 Cusset
 Dachstein, Bas-Rhin	
 Dambach-la-Ville
 Dax, Landes	
 Decize
 Die, Drôme	
 Diemeringen
 Dieppe, Seine-Maritime	
 Dinan
 Dole, Jura	
 Domfront, Orne	
 Domme, Dordogne	
 Dun-sur-Auron
 Espalion
 Eu, Seine-Maritime	
 Évreux
 Falaise, Calvados	
 Faucogney-et-la-Mer
 Feurs
 Figeac
 Fos-sur-Mer
 Fougères
 Fréjus, Var	
 Givet
 Granville, Manche	
 Grenoble
 Guémar, Haut-Rhin	
 Guérande
 Hennebont
 Herrlisheim-près-Colmar
 Hesdin
 Hiers-Brouage
 Honfleur
 Île-d'Aix
 Illfurth
 Issoudun, Indre	
 Isturits
 Joigny
 La Cavalerie
 La Charité-sur-Loire
 La Chassagne
 La Couvertoirade
 La Groutte
 La Martyre
 La Roche-de-Glun
 La Rochelle
 La Roche-Posay
 La Sauvetat, Puy-de-Dôme	
 La Turbie
 Langres
 Lanneray
 Lantabat
 Laon
 Larceveau-Arros-Cibits
 Larressingle
 Laval, Mayenne	
 Le Castellet, Var	
 Le Crozet
 Le Malzieu-Ville
 Le Mont-Saint-Michel
 Le Palais
 Le Poët-Laval
 Le Quesnoy
 Le Thor
 Les Andelys
 Les Cluses
 Levens
 Loches – large parts remain intact. The upper town and the Loches castle are built on a hill which offers a strategic position over the surrounding countryside and the Indre river. The walls of the upper town remain largely intact and include the ruins of the Porte de Saint-Ours, the well preserved Porte Royale, long stretches of curtain wall and several towers and bastions. The walls of the lower town are partly demolished, but 4 towers, a few smaller later-added turrets, a long section of curtain wall and the well preserved Porte des Cordeliers and Porte Picois (which now serves as the City hall) still remain intact. 
 Loudun, Vienne	
 Lucéram
 Maisod
 Mans
 Marcolès
 Marsal, Moselle	
 Marville, Meuse	
 Maubeuge
 Mende, Lozère	
 Mennetou-sur-Cher
 Metz
 Meursac
 Molsheim
 Monceaux-sur-Dordogne
 Mondoubleau
 Monpazier
 Montarcher
 Montbrison, Loire	
 Mont-de-Marsan
 Monteux
 Montfort-sur-Meu
 Montivilliers
 Mont-Louis
 Montréal, Yonne	
 Montreuil, Pas-de-Calais	
 Montreuil-Bellay
 Montverdun
 Moret-sur-Loing
 Morlaix
 Mougins
 Mouzon, Ardennes	
 Nabas, Pyrénées-Atlantiques	
 Nages-et-Solorgues
 Nantes
 Narbonne
 Navarrenx
 Neubois
 Neuf-Brisach
 Nevers
 Nice, Alpes-Maritimes	
 Nieul-sur-l'Autise
 Nîmes
 Notre-Dame-de-Gravenchon
 Oberhaslach
 Obernai
 Oradour-sur-Glane, Haute-Vienne	
 Orange, Vaucluse	
 Orgon
 Ostabat-Asme
 Paris	
 Parthenay
 Pérouges
 Pertuis
 Pesmes
 Placey
 Ploërmel
 Poitiers, Vienne	
 Poligny, Jura	
 Pommiers, Loire	
 Pont-de-l'Arche
 Pontgibaud
 Pont-l'Abbé-d'Arnoult
 Pontoise
 Pouilly-lès-Feurs
 Prades-le-Lez
 Prats-de-Mollo-la-Preste
 Provins
 Puycelsi
 Quimper, Finistère	
 Quintin
 Rânes
 Rauzan
 La Réole
 Revest-des-Brousses
 Ribeauvillé
 Richelieu, Indre-et-Loire	
 Rions
 Riquewihr
 Rocamadour
 Rochefort, Charente-Maritime	
 Rocroi
 Rodemack
 Romenay
 Rosheim
 Rouffach
 Roye, Somme	
 Ruoms
 Saint-Bertrand-de-Comminges
 Saint-Dyé-sur-Loire
 Sainte-Croix-sur-Buchy
 Saint-Émilion, Gironde	
 Saintes, Charente-Maritime
 Sainte-Eulalie-de-Cernon	
 Sainte-Suzanne-et-Chammes
 Saint-Étienne-de-Baïgorry
 Saint-Félix-Lauragais
 Saint-Gence
 Saint-Hippolyte, Haut-Rhin	
 Saint-Jean-Pied-de-Port
 Saint-Junien – A tower and remains of the curtain wall remain behind houses at the junction of the Boulevard de la République and the Rue de Brèche. 
 Saint-Laurent-des-Arbres
 Saint-Léger-Magnazeix
 Saint-Lô
 Saint-Macaire
 Saint-Marcouf, Manche	
 Saint-Martin-d'Arrossa
 Saint-Mitre-les-Remparts
 Saint-Omer
 Saint-Pastour
 Saint-Paul-de-Vence
 Saint-Pompont
 Saint-Suliac
 Saint-Sulpice-de-Favières
 Saint-Trivier-sur-Moignans
 Saint-Valery-sur-Somme – Large parts remain, including the Porte de Nevers, the Porte Jeanne d'Arc, stretches of curtain wall and some towers. A hill named Cap Hornu arises above the town which is the most likely and possible location of the Roman Saxon Shore fort and harbour named Locus Quartensis sive Hornensis. 
 Saint-Vérain
 Saissac
 Sarralbe
 Sarrebourg
 Saumur, Maine-et-Loire	
 Sauvain
 Sélestat
 Semur-en-Auxois
 Senlis, Oise	
 Sens, Yonne	
 Septème
 Sisteron
 Soissons
 Sorel-Moussel
 Strasbourg
 Suèvres
 Thann, Haut-Rhin	
 Thionville, Moselle	
 Thouars
 Tillac
 Tincry
 Toul, Meurthe-et-Moselle	
 Toulouse
 Tours, Indre-et-Loire	
 Trôo
 Turckheim
 Uzès
 Vabre
 Vannes
 Vaucouleurs, Meuse	
 Venasque
 Vence
 Verdun, Meuse	
 Vervins
 Vézelay
 Vianne
 Vienne, Isère	
 Viens, Vaucluse	
 Vievy-le-Rayé
 Villefranche-de-Conflent
 Villeneuve-sur-Yonne
 Vitré, Ille-et-Vilaine	
 Vouvant
 Wangen, Bas-Rhin	
 Wattwiller
 Westhoffen
 Wissembourg
 Zellenberg

Germany

 Aachen, some parts of the inner walls still remain alongside Tempelgraben (at the corner with the Eilfschornsteinstraße and the corner with the Pontstraße), and at the back of the houses alongside Seilgraben. Of the outer walls three towers, the Langer Turm, Pfaffenturm and the Marienturm, still stand today. The two remaining city gates, Ponttor and Marschiertor, are among the best preserved gates in Germany.
 Aach
 Abensberg
 Ahrweiler
 Aichach
 Altentreptow – the remains include some stretches of wall, a tower and two town gates, the Brandenburger Tor and the Demminer Tor.
 Annaberg-Buchholz
 Amberg
 Amöneburg
 Andernach
 Arberg – only one town gate remains.
 Arnstadt
 Aschaffenburg
 Aub – large sections of the walls remain, including some towers. One town gate remains, the Zentturm.
 Babenhausen
 Bad Colberg-Heldburg
 Bad Frankenhausen
 Bad Hersfeld
 Bad Langensalza – large parts of the walls still remain today, including 12 wall towers and one city gate, the Klagetor.
 Bad Münstereifel
 Bad Neustadt an der Saale
 Bad Orb
 Bad Rodach
 Bad Sooden-Allendorf
 Bad Waldsee
 Bad Wimpfen
 Bacharach
 Ballenstedt 
 Barby
 Bautzen
 Beilngries
 Berching
 Berlin had a defensive wall around the city from about 1250 until the mid-17th century, and a Customs Wall from the mid-18th to the mid-19th centuries. The Berlin Wall that existed from 1961 to 1989 was claimed by the authorities of East Germany to be defensive, but in fact it was rather intended to prevent unauthorized emigration. Parts of Berlin's medieval wall still remain alongside the Littenstraße.
 Bernau bei Berlin
 Bernkastel – one town gate, the Graacher Tor, remains. 
 Besigheim
 Blankenburg (Harz)
 Bodenwerder
 Boizenburg
 Boppard
 Bönnigheim – some parts of the walls and a town gate remain.
 Brandenburg
 Buchen
 Burgau
 Burg bei Magdeburg
 Burghausen
 Butzbach
 Büdingen
 Calbe
 Chemnitz – only one tower remains, the Roter Turm (Red Tower).
 Coburg
 Cologne
 Crailsheim – some remains are located north of the Ringgasse, including a wall tower. Another tower remains alongside the Grabenstraße.
 Darmstadt
 Dausenau – the walls remain almost intact. One town gate still remains, the Torturm.
 Delitzsch
 Demmin large parts of the city walls still remain alongside Nordmauer, Bauhofstraße and Südmauer. One town gate still remains, the Luisentor.
 Dettelbach
 Dillenburg
 Dillingen
 Dilsberg
 Dinkelsbühl – the medieval town walls remain fully intact, including 4 gates and 19 towers.
 Dollnstein
 Dömitz
 Donauwörth
 Dresden – Dresden's defensive walls were some of the first in Germany, inspired by the earlier Italian model. The walls surrounded both the ‘Old City’ south of the Elbe, and the ‘New City’ to the north. The walls, gates and moats were largely removed c. 1815, following the Napoleonic Wars, being deemed outmoded for modern warfare. Some small sections have been rediscovered and established as the Museum Festung Dresden https://web.archive.org/web/20160509160153/http://www.festung-dresden.de/de/festung_dresden/museum/ below the more famous Brühl Terrace.
 Duderstadt
 Duisburg
 Ebern
 Eberbach (Baden)
 Eibelstadt
 Eichstätt
 Einbeck
 Eisenheim
 Ellwangen
 Eltville am Rhein
 Emden
 Erding
 Erlangen – some stretches of wall still remain alongside Nördliche Stadtmauerstraße, Wöhrstraße and Schulstraße.
 Feuchtwangen
 Fladungen
 Forchheim
 Freiberg
 Freyburg, Germany
 Freystadt
 Friedberg, Bavaria
 Freinsheim
 Frickenhausen am Main
 Fritzlar
 Gangelt
 Gardelegen – there are several remains of the old town wall, including the impressive Salzwedeler Tor, the remains of the Stendaler Tor, and some stretches of wall.
 Gartz (Oder) – The remains of the walls around the medieval town include some sizable stretches of walls, towers and one town gate, the Stettiner Tor. 
 Geisa
 Gelnhausen
 Germersheim
 Gerolzhofen
 Göllheim – two town gates are preserved, the Kerzenheimer Tor and the Dreisener Tor. One tower remains, the Ulrichsturm.
 Gräfenberg – the remains include three well-preserved town gates, the Egloffsteiner Tor, the Hiltpoltsteiner Tor and the Gesteiger Tor. Some parts of the walls still remain adjacent to the Gesteiger Tor and at the back of the houses alongside Am Gesteiger and Schulgasse.
 Grebenstein – most of the medieval walls are still surrounding the old town. One town gate remains, the Burgtor.
 Greding
 Grimma
 Grimmen one tower still remains, the Wasserturm. All three of the original town gates also remain, the Stralsunder Tor, Greifswalder Tor and the Mühlentor.
 Großostheim
 Gundelfingen an der Donau
 Gundelsheim
 Gunzenhausen
 Güstrow – remains of the walls remain south of the cathedral and alongside the Gelviner Mauer. The town 
 Haldensleben
 Hannoversch Münden
 Hattingen
 Heidelsheim – one town gate and a wall tower still remain today.
 Heidingsfeld, today part of Würzburg
 Heilbad Heiligenstadt
 Herborn
 Herrieden
 Hildburghausen
 Hirschhorn
 Haldensleben
 Hammelburg
 Hardgesen
 Hollfeld – the remains include one town gate, the Obere Tor, and some parts of the walls to the south of the old town.
 Homberg, Efze
 Horn
 Höchstadt an der Aisch
 Höchstädt an der Donau
 Horb am Neckar – large sections of the walls still remain. One town gate, the Ihlinger Tor, still remains, and some towers still remain, most notably the Schurkenturm and the Schütteturm.
 Höxter
 Hünfeld
 Ingelheim am Rhein – sizable remains, including stretches of wall, the Malakoffturm, the Bismarckturm, Ohrenbrückertor, Uffhubtor and the ruined Heidesheimer Tor. The medieval town centre also houses the ruins of the Ingelheimer Kaiserpfalz.
 Ingolstadt
 Iphofen
 Jena
 Kallenhardt
 Karlstadt am Main
 Alt Kaster – The old medieval town of Kaster now forms part of Bedburg. The town walls remain largely intact, including 2 town gates and several towers. 
 Kaub
 Kaufbeuren
 Kemnath – several sections and towers of the walls remain around the medieval town. The eastern town gate was later converted into a church tower.
 Kempen – some parts of the walls still remain. They include the Kuhtor, a well-preserved town gate, the Mühlenturm and the remains of another town gate, the Peterstor.
 Kindelbrück 
 Kirchberg an der Jagst
 Kirchhain
 Kirchheim unter Teck
 Kitzingen
 Kroppenstedt
 Korbach
 Kranenburg
 Kronach
 Kulmbach
 Kuppenheim
 Kyritz
 Ladenburg
 Landsberg am Lech
 Landshut
 Langenzenn
 Laucha an der Unstrut
 Lauchheim
 Lauingen
 Lauf an der Pegnitz
 Laufen
 Lauffen am Neckar – the old town consists of three parts. While the town is divided by the river Neckar, the castle stands on a small island circled by the river. On the left bank there is a sizable stretch of wall is located next to the church. On the right bank, some towers, stretches of wall and the Neues Heilbronner Tor still remain.
 Leipheim
 Leipzig – remains include the Moritzbastei bastion. 
 Leonberg
 Leutershausen
 Löbejün
 Lohr am Main
 Lübben
 Luckau
 Magdeburg
 Mainbernheim
 Maintal – large sections of the walls still remain, notably to the north of the medieval town.
 Mainz – the remains include the well-preserved square-shaped citadel, the medieval Alexanderturm, and the remains of a bastion alongside the Augustusstraße.
 Malchin two town gates still remain, the Kalensches Tor and the Steintor. Some parts of the walls to the south and east of the town still remain.
 Marbach am Neckar
 Markt Einersheim – two town gates still remain.
 Marktbreit
 Mayen
 Meisenheim
 Mellrichstadt
 Memmingen
 Meppen – the remains include a star shaped moat around the medieval town.
 Merkendorf
 Meyenburg
 Michelstadt
 Miltenberg
 Mindelheim
 Möckmühl
 Monheim – two town gates remain, the Oberes Tor and the Unteres Tor.
 Mühlhausen
 Müncheberg
 Munich has some of its former city gates still standing, and a section of its late 13th-century defensive wall.
 Münnerstadt
 Münzenberg – fragments of the walls remain, including two towers.
 Monheim – some stretches of wall still remain and both town gates, the Oberes Tor and the Unteres Tor, are preserved.
 Nabburg
 Naumburg
 Neckarsulm
 Neubrandenburg
 Neubrunn
 Neuburg an der Donau – some parts of the medieval walls still remain, including the Unteres Tor. The trace of the later bastion earthworks, the so-called Untere Schanze, Elias Holl Schanze and Oberer Schanze, is still recognizable in the fields and from the air.
 Neudenau
 Neuenstadt am Kocher
 Neuenstein
 Neuleiningen
 Neumarkt in der Oberpfalz
 Neunkirchen am Brand – three town gates still remain, the Forchheimer Tor, the Erleinhofer Tor and the Erlanger Tor.
 Neuss
 Neustadt (Hessen)
 Neustadt an der Aisch – substantial parts of the walls still remain, including some towers and a well-preserved town gate, te Nürnberger Tor.
 Neustadt in Holstein – one town gate remains, the Kremper Tor.
 Niedernberg – several stretches of the walls wall remain. One wall tower remains at the riverside end of the Turmgasse
 Niedernhall – most of the town walls remain intact.
 Nordhausen
 Nördlingen
 Nürnberg
 Obernburg am Main
 Oberwesel
 Ochsenfurt
 Oebisfelde
 Oettingen
 Öhringen
 Oldenburg
 Oppenheim – some stretches of the town walls remain near the ruins of Landskron castle. One town gate and two towers remain, the Gautor, the Ruprechtsturm and the Uhrturm.
 Ornbau
 Orsoy
 Ortenberg
 Oschatz
 Ostheim
 Paderborn
 Pappenheim
 Pasewalk
 Tribsees – two town gates remain, the Steintor and the Mühlentor
 Trier-Pfalzel
 Pfullendorf
 Pößneck
 Potsdam
 Prenzlau there are some good remains of the walls, especially North, East and South of the town. 4 gates still remain, the Steintor, Wasserpforte, Mitteltor and the Blindower Tor. The walls also include 25 towers.
 Prenzlin
 Prichsenstadt
 Querfurt
 Radolfzell am Bodensee
 Ratingen
 Ravensburg – three town gates still remain, the Frauentor, Obertor and the Untertor. Nine of the original ten wall towers still remain, most notably a tower named Mehlsack.
 Recklinghausen two defensive towers and some portions of wall still remain today, north west of the old city.
 Reichelsheim – three towers remain.
 Rodach
 Rees – large parts of the town walls still remain intact, mainly located at the riverside of the town and in the parks at the north-east and west side of the medieval town.
 Rheinbach
 Rheinberg
 Rhens – the town walls remain largely intact. Three town gates still remain, the Rheintor, the Josephstor and the ruins of the Viehtor.
 Rostock
 Röttingen
 Roth
 Rothenburg ob der Tauber
 Rottweil
 Rüthen
 Salzkotten
 Salzwedel
 Schleusingen
 Schlüsselfeld
 Schmalkalden
 Schongau, Bavaria
 Schrobenhausen
 Schwaigern
 Schwalmstadt – the remains of a town gate still survive, the medieval Lüdertor. The earthworks are mostly demolished, leaving a moat of which the course indicates the location of four round bastions.
 Schweinfurt
 Seehausen – the moat still surrounds most of the medieval town. Fragments of the walls are to be found at the southern side of the old town. One town gate still remains, the Beustertor.
 Seßlach
 Seligenstadt – the remains include the Steinheimer Torturm, the Pulverturm and a tower at the Friedhofsmauer.
 Segnitz
 Soest – 2.5 km of the town walls (1180) are still intact, also a town gate ("Osthofentor", with the world largest collection of crossbow bolts) and a defense tower ("Kattenturm").
 Sommerach
 Sömmerda
 Sommerhausen
 Spalt
 Spangenberg
 Stade
 Staßfurt
 Stadt Blankenberg
 Steinheim
 Steinau an der Straße
 Stendal – two town gates still remain.
 Sternberg
 Stadtsteinach
 Stralsund
 Sulzbach – sizable parts of the walls and towers still remain. One town gate is preserved, the Rosenberger Tor.
 Sulzfeld am Main
 Tangermünde – most of the town walls still remain, including some towers.
 Templin
 Themar
 Treysa – the remains are located mainly South, East and North of the old town.
 Trier, portions of the city walls still exist, but the size of the Roman gate, the "Porta Nigra", gives evidence of the importance of the city. Other Roman remains include the baths, the Constantine Basilica, an amphitheater, and a 2nd-century AD Roman bridge.
 Torgau
 Überlingen
 Uffenheim
 Ulm an der Donau
 Villach
 Villingen
 Vilseck
 Vilshofen an der Donau
 Vellberg
 Volkach
 Waiblingen
 Waldenburg
 Waldfeucht
 Wangen im Allgäu
 Warburg (Westfalia)
 Wassertrüdingen
 Wemding
 Weikersheim
 Weil der Stadt
 Weilrod – the only town gate still remains.
 Weißenburg (Bavaria)
 Werben – one town gate still remains to the north east of the medieval town, the Elbtor. A tower with adjacent portion of the town wall remains to the west of the medieval town.
 Wertheim
 Wettenberg
 Windsbach
 Winterhausen
 Wittstock
 Witzenhausen
 Woldegk
 Wolframs-Eschenbach
 Worms, Germany
 Wörth am Main
 Wunsiedel 3 towers, small portions of the walls and a town gate (Koppetentor) still remain.
 Würzburg
 Xanten
 Zeil am Main
 Zerbst
 Zons
 Zülpich
 Zwickau

Gibraltar
Gibraltar

Greece

Many towns and cities still retain at least parts of their defensive walls, including:
 Arta
 Athens – mostly demolished, see city walls of Athens
 Chania – see Fortifications of Chania
 Chios
 Corfu (city)
 Drama, Greece – sizable parts of the town walls remain to the north and east side of the old town. Including 2 towers and stretches of wall.
 Heraklion Candia Khandak – see Fortifications of Heraklion see siege of Candia – Arab and Byzantine walls still remain, about 20%, Venetian 7.5 km long walls, 95% still remain, 30.000 people live now inside the Venecian walls. Two gates, one castle in the sea (Koules) 
 Ioannina – see Ioannina Castle
 Kastoria – fragmentary remains. 
 Kavala (a significant part of the seaside walls survive)
 Kissamos
 Komotini
 Koroni – preserved fortifications of the castle and upper town.
 Missolonghi
 Monemvassia
 Mystras
 Nafplion
 Naupactus
 Preveza
 Rethymno – see Fortezza of Rethymno
 Rhodes – see Fortifications of Rhodes
 Thessaloniki – see Walls of Thessaloniki
 Veria (about 170 m of the Byzantine walls survive)

Hungary
 Buda – the Castle Hill is surrounded by preserved medieval and early modern fortifications. Only a short section survived from the walls of the Víziváros neighbourhood.
 Pest – segments of the 15th-century city walls are preserved inside the courtyards of later houses.
 Sopron – medieval circle of walls partly built on ancient Roman foundations
 Pécs – long sections of the medieval walls are preserved and freed to later intrusions.
 Veszprém – walled old town on Castle Hill
 Székesfehérvár – long sections of the medieval walls are preserved
 Sárospatak
 Vác – some segments and one tower preserved
 Eger – some segments preserved, mostly demolished
 Győr – the walls were demolished in the 19th century but segments are preserved
 Mosonmagyaróvár – the walls were demolished in the 1820s
 Szécsény – some segments of the city walls preserved

Republic of Ireland

Italy

 Acqui Terme – three town gates and remains of walls.
 Acuto
 Albenga – fragmentary remains, including stretches of wall and 3 town gates.
 Alghero
 Altamura – some remains; two gates are still visible, namely Porta Bari and Porta dei Martiri
 Ancona
 Anghiari
 Aosta's Roman walls are still preserved almost in their entirety
 Appignano
 Aquasparta
 Arcevia
 Asolo
 Assisi
 Arezzo – Large parts of the town walls still survive, including several stretches of curtain wall, 6 bastions, 4 town gates and the well preserved citadel Fortezza Medicea. 
 Bagnacavallo – two town gates remain.
 Bari – historically a walled port city on a promontory but only two bastions and a short section of the sea walls survived
 Bassano del Grappa
 Bastia Umbra
 Belvedere Ostrense
 Belluno
 Bergamo – surrounding hill of the old city
 Bisceglie
 Bologna
 Bosco Marengo – a large part of the north-western walls with towers are preserved. 
 Bozzolo
 Brescia – the castle hill (called Cidneo Hill) is surrounded by preserved medieval and Renaissance fortifications. Segments of Roman and venetian walls are partially survived
 Bressanone – the western gate remains as well as the north side where the houses serves as walls
 Brindisi – several parts of the walls are preserved, including 5 bastions and two town gates, the Porta Lecce and the Porta Mesagne. 
 Brunico – three gates remain, the western, northern and eastern ones. 
 Busseto
 Cagli
 Cagliari
 Caltagirone 
 Camerino
 Capua
 Castel Bolognese – three wall towers still remain. 
 Castel del Monte
 Castel Goffredo – tiny fraction of the walls and a tower remain 
 Castelfranco Veneto – the old town is completely surrounded by medieval walls and a moat
 Castelvetro di Modena
 Castelsardo
 Castiglion Fiorentino
 Castiglione di Garfagnana
 Castiglione del Lago's old town has fully preserved walls
 Cesena
 Cingoli
 Cittadella – one of the best preserved walled towns in Italy, there's a small breach on the northwestern part (the walls are fully walkable)
 Città della Pieve
 Città di Castello
 Cividale del Friuli – small part of the walls remain on the north east
 Colmurano
 Cologna Veneta – minor part of the walls remaining on the western side
 Como – about 70% is remaining with a few towers
 Cordovado – two town gates remain
 Corinaldo
 Corridonia
 Cortona
 Crema
 Crotone
 Domodossola –  a tiny fraction remains behind the church
 Este, Veneto – parts of walls still remaining
 Fabriano
 Faenza
 Falerone
 Fano – large sections of the Roman walls and towers are preserved. One town gate still remains, the Roman Arco di Augusto.
 Felizzano
 Ferrara – originally 13 km now 9 km remain
 Firenzuola
 Fiuggi
 Florence
 Foligno
 Fossano – a minor part remains, particularly a bastion at the north end
 Forlì – remains include the ruins of the Porta Schiavona. The foundations of a tower can be found in the roundabout at the Piazza Santa Chiara.
 Gallipoli
 Gemona
 Genoa has partial fortifications still standing
 Glurns Glorenza in Italian, the medieval stone walls fully encapsulate the old town
 Gradara
 Gradisca d'Isonzo – large part of the walls and towers still intact
 Grosseto's star shaped town walls are almost completely intact.
 Guardiagrele
 Guastalla – a star-shaped road around the town indicates the trace of the fortifications. A wall tower still stands at the corner Via Giuseppe Verdi/Via Volturno. 
 Iglesias
 Isernia
 Ivrea
 Jesi
 Lanciano
 Lazise – part of the northern and southern walls still intact, including several towers and 3 town gates. 
 Lecce
 Lecco – small part of the walls remains on the north east
 Leonessa
 Livorno
 Loano
 Loro Piceno
 Lucca
 Macerata
 Marostica – The defensive walls around the old town are fully intact. The walls are among the best preserved medieval defensive structures in Italy. Including 3 town gates, 20 towers and two castles, the Castello Superiore and the Castello Inferiore. 
 Marsala
 Marta
 Massa Martana
 Massa Fermana
 Matera
 Melfi
 Messina – see Fortifications of Messina
 Mignano Monte Lungo – the Porta Fratte town gate is the only remain of the medieval town walls.
 Mineo
 Mondolfo
 Monopoli
 Montefalco
 Montegiorgio
 Monteriggioni 
 Montagnana – perfectly preserved medieval walls and one of the most impressive in Europe
 Montappone – small fortified town. The town directly borders the walled town of Massa Fermana
 Montecassiano
 Montecatini Terme
 Monte del Lago
 Monte San Giusto – fragmentary remains, including an impressive town gate and a tower.
 Monte San Pietrangeli
 Monte San Savino
 Monte Vidon Corrado
 Muggia – remains include two towers, two stone bastions, two town gates and large stretches of the walls.
 Naples
 Nardò – several fragments of the walls still stand around the town, including many towers which are incorporated in houses. 
 Narni
 Nettuno
 Noale
 Norcia
 Novi Ligure
 Orbetello
 Orvieto
 Ostra
 Ostuni
 Otranto
 Padova
 Palmanova  has fortress plan and structure, called a star fort it is a nine pointed citadel
 Passignano Sul Trasimeno
 Pavia
 Perugia
 Pesaro – the remains include two bastions, a curtain wall and a town gate, the Porta Rimini. 
 Peschiera del Garda – fortified town surrounded by water
 Peschici
 Petriolo
 Piacenza has large sections of its Renaissance walls still standing
 Piglio
 Piombino
 Pisa
 Pistoia
 Pizzighettone – nearly completely surrounded by walls apart from a few breaches
 Pollenza
 Pontremoli
 Portobuffolé – little town with a gate remaining
 Portoferraio
 Potenza Piceno
 Pozzuoli
 Prato
 Procida
 Rapagnano
 Rapolano Terme
 Ravenna
 Reggio Emilia – very little remains of the medieval town walls. One town gate remains, the impressive Porta Santa Croce. A stretch of wall is located at the Viale Monte Grappa.
 Ricetto di Candelo – small town completely surrounded by walls
 Rieti 
 Rimini
 Riva del Garda – parts of the walls and two gates remain
 Rome has walls since the Roman Empire
 Rovereto – a part of the medieval stone walls remains on the eastern side
 Sabbioneta – surrounded by a star fort
 Salò – two gates remaining
 San Costanzo – one of the smallest fortified towns in Italy
 San Gemini
 San Gimignano
 San Severino Marche
 San Vito al Tagliamento – part of the walls remain and three gates
 Santarcangelo di Romagna – most of the medieval town wall remains around the old town, including long stretches of wall, a gate and several towers.
 Sansepolcro
 Sant'Angelo in Pontano
 Sassari fragmentary remains, mainly at the north side of the old town.
 Savignaro Sul Panaro
 Sciacca
 Senigallia
 Serra De'Conti
 Sesto al Reghena – two gates remain
 Siena
 Siracusa
 Soave – town surrounded by medieval walls and three gates (Porta Bassano, Porta Vicentina and Porta Verona)
 Soncino – nearly completely surrounded by walls and a moat
 Spilamberto – one town gate still remains.
 Spilimbergo 
 Spoleto
 Staffolo
 Sulmona
 Susa – fragmentary remains of Roman walls. The cathedral is built against the side of the Roman town gate Porta Savoia. Several parts of the walls and three lowered towers can be found alongside the Corso Unione Sovietica.
 Talamone
 Tarquinia
 Termoli
 Terra del Sole almost all town walls remain, with four bastion and two gate (Porta Romana and Fiorentina). Ideal-town of renaissance
 Todi
 Torino – the remains include the impressive Roman town gate Porta Palatina and 3 bastions with turrets and curtain walls in the park nearby the Porta Palatina. 
 torre San Patrizio
 Torri del Benaco – minor part of the wall remaining on the south side
 Trapani
 Treia
 Trevi
 Treviso
 Tuscania
 Udine – fraction of the walls remain and two gates
 Urbino
 Urbisaglia
 Verona
 Veruccio
 Venzone – medieval stone walls surrounding the town, partly rebuilt after the 1976 earthquake
 Vicenza large sections of the town walls still remain, mainly alongside the Viale Giuseppe Mazzini, Via Goivanni Cecciarini and the Via Legione Gallieno. Four town gates remain, the Porta San Bortolo, Porta Santa Lucia, Porta Castello and the Porta Santa Croce.
 Villafranca di Verona – completely intact walls part of the castle
 Vipiteno – a tower gate remains
 Volterra
 Vaste

Latvia
 Riga – the best preserved part of the old town walls is the Powder Tower. Just north west of the Powder Tower remains a stretch of wall with a square tower. Foundations of the wall can be seen at Kalēju iela street, and there are fragments of a ruined wall at the site of a demolished building at Minsterejas iela street. The only remains of the earthen ramparts around the old town is a star shaped moat, now transformed into a park.
 Cēsis
 Daugavpils fortress (Not a true walled city, but a huge fortress with buildings)
 Limbaži
 Valmiera

Lithuania
 Vilnius (Can be seen in some places)
 Kaunas (Partially built)

Luxembourg

 Luxembourg City

Macedonia
 Ohrid
 Skopje

Malta

Monaco
 Monaco

Montenegro

 Kotor
 Bar
 Budva
 Herceg Novi
 Kotor – built by Illyrian tribes in the 9th century and enlarged many times from the 13th century until the 19th century.
 Podgorica
 Sveti Stefan
 Ulcinj

Netherlands

Norway
 Fredrikstad
 Gamlebyen
 Oslo (Akershus Fortress)

Poland

 Biała
 Białogard
 Bolesławiec – the old town has fragmentary remains of the old town wall, including several towers and stretches of wall.
 Braniewo
 Brodnica
 Brzeg – a star-shaped park around the old town is what remains of the renaissance fortifications. Some parts of the moat still remain. The shape of seven bastions is recognizable from the air.
 Bystrzyca Kłodzka
 Chełmno – almost whole length of walls (2.2 km), with 17 watch towers and city gate, 13th and 14th centuries.
 Chojna
 Chojnice
 Dąbie
 Dzierżoniów
 Gdańsk
 Głogów
 Gniew
 Goleniów
 Golub-Dobrzyń
 Gorzów Wielkopolski
 Grodków
 Grudziądz
 Gryfice
 Gryfino
 Jawor
 Jelenia Góra
 Kalisz
 Kamień Pomorski
 Kętrzyn
 Kłodzko – the remains include the impressive citadel located on a hill north of the medieval town.
 Kołobrzeg – a round basion and a part of the moat still remain.
 Kostrzyn – the medieval town was entirely destroyed during World War II, only remaining some ruins of houses, the ruins of a church and the riverside fortified walls. The fortified walls include three bastions and a land gate. The remaining moat of an outer work is located north west of the ruined medieval town.
 Koszalin
 Kowalewo Pomorskie
 Kożuchów
 Kraków – only the barbican, Floriańska Gate, two watch towers and some traces preserved
 Krapkowice
 Kwidzyn
 Legnica
 Lębork – city ruins from the Medieval era
 Lidzbark Warmiński
 Lipiany
 Lubań – partially preserved
 Lubawa
 Lubin
 Lublin
 Malbork – one gate and a round bastion still remain. Stretches of the walls still remain alongside the river in the direction of the famous Malbork Castle
 Maszewo – the town walls are nearly complete, apart from two breaches made for the increasing traffic. The two original town gates are demolished, and an adjacent tower of one of the gates still remains.
 Mieszkowice
 Modlin Fortress
 Myślibórz
 Nowe – sizable parts of the walls remain.
 Nowe Miasto Lubawskie – two town gates remain.
 Nowogrodziec
 Nysa – there are large remains of the renaissance fortifications, notably to the east of the old town and to the north of the Nysa Klodzka river. There are several forts around Nysa. The remains of the medieval town walls include two land gates, the remains of a water gate, some towers and stretches of wall.
 Olkusz
 Olsztyn
 Opole – the remaining walls are located in the north east corner of the medieval town.
 Paczków – very well preserved walls with 19 towers and 3 gates
 Pasłęk – large stretches of the walls remain intact, including two city gates
 Poznań – city walls existed until the early 19th century (fragments remain); Prussian fortifications were built in the 19th century
 Prabuty
 Prudnik – three watch towers
 Przemyśl – partially preserved ruins
 Pyrzyce – until World War II best preserved city walls in Pomerania region, from the 14th century
 Sandomierz
 Słupsk
 Stargard – significant parts survived with 3 gates (including unique water gate – Brama Młyńska); one of the most interesting city walls in Poland
 Starogard Gdański
 Strzegom
 Sulechów
 Susz
 Syców
 Szczecin – to the east of the castle remains a well-preserved wall tower. Two town gates still remain.
 Szprotawa
 Szydłów – city walls with Krakowska Gate and watch towers built in the 14th century
 Środa Śląska
 Świebodzice
 Świebodzin
 Tarnów
 Tczew
 Toruń – several watch towers, three city gates and some sections (the longest and most impressive from Vistula) from the 13th to 15th centuries
 Trzcińsko-Zdrój
 Trzebiatów
 Warsaw – partially preserved, partially restored after World War II, barbican restored
 Wieluń
 Wolin – only one bastion remains to the south of the town.
 Wrocław
 Ząbkowice Śląskie
 Zamość – complete renaissance and 19th-century walls preserved
 Złotoryja
 Żagań
 Żary

Portugal
 Almeida Vauban style fortress town.
 Avis (or Aviz)
 Beja
 Bragança – the old town is still completely surrounded with medieval walls, including all 12 towers and two gates.
 Caminha
 Castelo Branco
 Castelo de Vide
 Chaves
 Coimbra
 Évora
 Elvas – Elvas is among the finest examples of intensive usage of the trace italienne (star fort) in military architecture.
 Estremoz
 Guarda
 Guimarães
 Lagos, Portugal
 Lisboa, Portugal – There are fragments of a Fernandin Wall since the 13th century. 
 Marvão
 Monção
 Monsaraz
 Monforte
 Óbidos
 Olivenza
 Peniche
 Santarém
 Setúbal – the remains of 5 bastions can be found around town.
 Valença
 Vide
 Vila Viçosa

Romania
 Alba Iulia
 Bistriţa
 Brașov
 Cluj-Napoca
 Constanța
 Mediaș
 Oradea
 Orăștie
 Sebeș
 Sibiu
 
 Sighișoara
 Timișoara

Russia

City walls
Derbent (a World Heritage site)
Izborsk
Moscow (the walls of the Bely Gorod have been dismantled, the Kitay-gorod wall for the most part too)
Pskov
Smolensk

Vyborg (two towers of the medieval wall remain, while one bastion on one side and a full set on the other remain from the bastioned fortifications)
Yaroslavl (only several towers still stand)

Kremlins (citadels)
Astrakhan
Ivangorod
Kazan
Kolomna
Moscow
Nizhny Novgorod
Novgorod
Porkhov
Tobolsk
Tula
Zaraysk

Serbia
 Belgrade – Kalemegdan
 Novi Sad – Petrovaradin
 Bač
 Manasija – Resava
 Niš
 Pirot
 Smederevo
 Golubac
 Maglič
 Šabac

Slovakia

Banská Bystrica
Banská Štiavnica – only one city gate left
Bardejov – walls almost completely preserved, with bastions and barbican
Beckov
Bojnice – large parts of the wall preserved, together with one of the city gates
Bratislava – only few structures have survived from original fortifications.
Brezno
Fiľakovo
Komárno – baroque fortifications almost completely preserved
Košice
Kremnica – about two-thirds of the defensive walls around the town preserved, with several bastions and the city gate with barbican.
Krupina
Levice – parts of the defensive walls were found during an archaeological survey
Levoča – almost completely preserved
Modra – about two-thirds of the walls still standing, one bastion and one of the city gates
Nové Zámky
Pezinok – parts of the defensive walls visible on several locations of the town
Podolínec
Pukanec
Prešov – parts of the defensive walls were found during an archaeological survey
Sabinov
Skalica – large parts preserved
Spišská Kapitula
Svätý Jur
Trenčín – parts of the defensive walls were found during an archaeological survey
Trnava – mostly preserved, with several bastions and one city gate
Zvolen
Žilina

Slovenia
Celje
Koper
Kranj – evidence of the 1st-century fortifications and parts of the medieval fortifications, with four of the original eight towers preserved
Ljubljana – In the 1st century AD, a Roman settlement called Emona, on the site of the present-day Ljubljana, was fortified with strong walls. A small section of the southern wall is still preserved to this day. Ljubljana got its medieval walls, like many other towns in Slovenia, in the 13th century
Maribor – 13th-century fortification, some segments of which, including four of the towers, are still preserved. The walls of Maribor withstood sieges by Matthias Corvinus in 1480/1481 and by the Ottoman Empire in 1532 and 1683
Novo Mesto
Piran – 7th-century fortification, expanded between 1470 and 1533
Ptuj – 13th-century fortification
Slovenj Gradec
Škofja Loka
Vipavski Križ

Spain
 A Coruña  – fragmentary remains and 3 gates
 Aínsa
 Alarcón
 Albarracín
 Alburquerque
 Alcalá de Henares – has preserved 1,200 metres of walls dotted with 19 towers
 Alcántara, Cáceres
 Alcúdia
 Almazán
 Alquézar
 Artajona
 Astorga
 Atienza
 Ávila – has the most complete medieval walls in Spain, half of which is navigable on foot
 Badajoz – has medieval walls and most of its renaissance fortress
 Balaguer
 Barcelona – has portions of a Roman wall
 Béjar
 Berlanga
 Berlanga de Duero
 Besalú
 Brihuega
 Buitrago del Lozoya – has complete medieval walls.
 Burgos – has some sizable remaining parts of the town walls alongside the Paseo Cubos and to the north east of the castle, including 10 wall towers. There are also remaining towers at the Calle Trinidad and the Calle San Lesmes. Five gates still remain intact, the Arco de Santa Maria, the Arco San Martin, the Arco de San Esteban, the Arco de San Gil and the Arco de San Juan
 Burgo de Osma-Ciudad de Osma
 Cáceres
 Campo Maior
 Cartagena
 Castellar de la Frontera
 Cedeira – fragmentary remains
 Ceuta
 Ciudad Rodrigo – suffered several sieges in Napoleonic wars, walls remain intact
 Ciutadella de Menorca
 Coca, Segovia
 Córdoba
 Coria – the old town is still completely surrounded by medieval and Roman walls
 Covarrubias, Province of Burgos
 Cuéllar
 Cuenca
 Daroca
 Frías, Province of Burgos
 Galisteo – the town walls are completely preserved
 Gijon
 Girona
 Granada
 Zarza de Granadilla
 Haza, Province of Burgos
 Hondarribia
 Huesca – fragmentary remains
 Ibiza
 Jerez de los Caballeros
 Laguardia
 Laredo – two town gates still remain, the Puerta de Merenillo and the Puerta de Bilbao
 Llanes
 León – has an almost complete set of Roman walls dating back to the 3rd century AD, besides some parts built during the Middle Ages
 Loarre
 Lugo – has completely intact Roman walls. It is protected by UNESCO as a World Heritage Site
 Maderuelo
 Walls of Madrid – five walls
 Maderuelo
 Madrigal de las Altas Torres
 Málaga
 Mansilla de las Mulas
 Manzaneda – Part of the medieval wall still remains, including one of the 3 gates
 Mataró
 Medina del Campo – fragmentary remains
 Melilla – the old town is still fully enclosed by its impressive medieval walls
 Mirambel
 Molina de Aragón
 Monforte de Lemos – most of the 13th century city walls have been preserved, including two gates.
 Montblanc
 Montfalco Murallat
 Mora de Rubielos
 Morella
 Niebla, Huelva
 Olivenza – the oldest part of the town, the area adjacent to the medieval castle of Olivenza, still has well-preserved stretches of walls and towers, including two original town gates. Large parts of the later star-shaped Renaissance fortifications are also preserved, including 9 bastions and 1 town gate, the Puerta del Calvario
 Olmedo
 Oviedo – has preserved parts of its medieval walls
 Palazuelos
 Palma, Majorca
 Pamplona
 Pedraza, Segovia
 Peniscola
 Plasencia
 Portillo, Valladolid – fragmentary remains
 Rada
 Rello
 Requena
 Ronda – has almost complete walls (not counting the gorge which defends it on one side)
 Salamanca
 San Vicente de la Barquera – the old town has preserved the walls along with the castle
 Santander – the old town had medieval defensive walls. A stretch of wall alongside Calle de Cadiz is all that remains
 Santiago de Compostela – only a gate (Arco de Mazarelos) remains
 Santillana del Mar – there are fragmentary remains of the medieval walls, including a stretch of wall alongside a car park southeast of the old town and a tower at the Plaza las Arenas facing to the north
 Sasamón
 Segovia – preserves parts of the wall plus three gates
 Sigüenza
 Talavera de la Reina
 Tarifa
 Tarragona
 Tiedra – vestiges
 Toledo
 Tortosa – large parts of the extensively fortified medieval town remain intact
 Tossa de Mar
 Tui – a large part of both the 12th century wall and the 17/18th century fortifications has been preserved.
 Urueña 
 Valencia – preserves portions of a Muslim wall and towers from Christian medieval age
 Valladolid – vestiges
 Vitoria-Gasteiz – fragmentary remains
 Viveiro – fragmentary remains and 3 gates of the original 6
 Xàtiva
 Zamora – the old town walls remain largely intact, especially at the north, west and riverside of the old town.
 Zaragoza

Sweden
 City wall of Visby
 Gothenburg has a part of the western city wall left, the bastion Carolus Rex at Esperantoplatsen (Esperanto square) and most of the city moat is still left.
 Halmstad had renaissance ramparts. To the north of the old town a bastion with adjacent town gate remains, the Norre Port. To the south of the old town a bastion with a remnant of the moat remains.
 Kalmar substantial remains of the walls. Sizable stretches of walls and a bastion remain to the south of the old town. To the east remain two bastions. To the north remain portions of wall near Fiskaregatan. To the west the shape of two bastions is clearly recognizable, with a ravelin in front of the remaining town gate Westport (Westgate). Two other town gates still remain, an unmanned gate of later date at the Skeppsbrogatan, and a gate at Skeppsbron.
 Stockholm has a small remainder of the medieval city wall preserved.
Bohus Fortress

Switzerland

 Aarau – the remains of the medieval town walls include two town gates (the Haldertor and the Oberer Turm) and a tower (the Pulverturm) with an adjacent stretch of wall.
 Altstätten
 Arbon – the remains include some fragments of wall and a tower converted into a house.
 Avenches
 Baden
 Basel
 Bellinzona (Dominated by its three castles: Castelgrande, Castello di Montebello and Castello di Sasso Corbaro)
 Biel
 Bremgarten
 Brugg
 Bülach
 Chur
 Delémont
 Diessenhofen
 Frauenfeld
 Fribourg
 Geneva
 Greifensee
 Grüningen
 Gruyères
 Ilanz
 Laufen
 Lausanne
 Lenzburg
 Liestal – one town gate remains.
 Lucerne – the wall on the northern bank of the Reuss is well preserved and among the principal landmarks of the city. It is called Museggmauer and Stadtmauer.
 Maienfeld
 Meienberg, Sins, Aargau
 Morges
 Münchenstein
 Murten: Medieval walls
 Neuchâtel
 Nyon
 Olten
 Orbe
 Rapperswil
 Regensberg
 Rheinfelden
 Romont
 Schaffhausen
 Sempach
 Solothurn – large parts still remain, including several walls, towers and a bastion. Two town gates remain, the impressive Baseltor and the Bieltor.
 Steckborn
 Sursee
 Thun
 Uznach
 Wangen an der Aare
 Werdenberg
 Wiedlisbach
 Willisau
 Winterthur
 Yverdon-les-Bains
 Zofingen
 Zug – the only remainder of the inner town walls is the Zeitturm (Clocktower), a medieval town gate. The remains of the outer town walls include four towers (the Kapuzinerturm, Knopfliturm, Huwilerturm and the Pulverturm), and some stretches of wall.
 Zurich – the main remains are the Schanzengraben, and the shapes of several bastions are recognizable through the course of the moat. One bastions remains largely intact, and it now houses the Alter Botanischer Garten.

Turkey

 Troy. The ancient city of Troy was famous for its defensive walls. There is archaeological evidence that Troy VII, generally identified as the stage of the legendary Trojan War of Homer's Iliad, usually dated between 1194 BC – 1184 BC, had walls with a carefully built stone base over four meters thick and some nine meters high in places, which was surmounted by a larger superstructure with towers in mudbrick. The walls in Homer's epic are so mighty that the siege of Troy by Achaeans lasts more than nine years, and only could be finished with the trickery of the Trojan Horse. Sections of the stone base of Trojan walls still survive on the archaeological site in present-day Hisarlık, in Çanakkale Province.
 Istanbul. The system of walls around (as it was then known) Constantinople built in 412 by the Roman emperor Theodosius II was a complex stone barrier that stretched 6.5 kilometers and is often called the Wall of Theodosius. This barrier stood impregnable for ten centuries and resisted several violent sieges until 1453 when the Ottomans succeeded in breaching the walls. There was a new element in the battlefield: the Ottoman army had powder cannon and the walls offered limited resistance to them.

 Diyarbakır. Diyarbakır is surrounded by an almost intact, dramatic set of high walls of black basalt forming a  circle around the old city. There are four gates into the old city and 82 watch-towers on the walls, which were built in antiquity, restored and extended by the Roman emperor Constantius in 349.
 Osmangazi
 Ankara
 Çanakkale
 İznik
 Antalya
 Sinop
 Rize
 Amasya
 Bodrum
 Alanya
 Ani
 Kuşadası
 Pergamon
 Assos
 Bozcaada
 Edirne
 Trabzon. The most of the city walls are still standing and are among the city's oldest buildings. In fact, their oldest part can be dated back to the 1st century AD during the Roman Empire era. Historical sources provide information about older stages of their construction. Xenophon, who visited the city in the 5th century BC also mentioned the existence of city walls
 Enez
 Bursa
 Sığacık

Ukraine
City walls
 Bilhorod-Dnistrovskyi
 Lviv (see Hlyniany Gate)

Citadels and castles
 Lutsk (see Lubart's Castle)
 Medzhybizh (see Medzhybizh Fortress)
 Uzhhorod (see Uzhhorod Castle)

United Kingdom

England

Northern Ireland

Scotland

Wales

 Aberystwyth
 Beaumaris
 Brecon
 Caerleon (Isca Augusta)
 Caerwent (Venta Silurum)
 Caernarfon
 Cardiff
 Cardigan
 Chepstow – Port Wall
 Cowbridge
 Conwy
 Denbigh
 Hay on Wye
 Kenfig
 Kidwelly
 Monmouth
 Montgomery
 Tenby
 Pembroke
 Radnor

Vatican City
 Vatican City

See also
 Defensive wall
 City gate
 Fortification
 List of walls
 Wall
 Stone wall
 Medieval fortification

References

 
Lists of buildings and structures